Gallows Hill is an unincorporated community in Springfield Township in Bucks County, Pennsylvania, United States. Gallows Hill is located at the intersection of Pennsylvania Route 412 and Stony Garden Road/Gallows Hill Road.

Etymology
The community's name was derived from an 18th-century traveler who hanged himself from a tree.

References

Unincorporated communities in Bucks County, Pennsylvania
Unincorporated communities in Pennsylvania